The Wyoming Division of State Parks and Historic Sites is the Wyoming state agency that administers its state parks.

Also known as Wyoming State Parks, Historic Sites & Trails, the agency is headquartered in Cheyenne, Wyoming.

See also
List of Wyoming state parks

References

External links 
Official site

State agencies of Wyoming
State history organizations of the United States